"La Carretera" is a song by American singer Prince Royce. The song was released on May 20, 2016  as the second single from Royce's fifth studio album, Five (2017). It was written by the singer and Daniel Santacruz, and produced by Dice and Lincoln Castañeda. The music video premiered on May 19, 2016.

Charts

Weekly charts

Year-end charts

Awards and nominations

Certifications

See also
List of Billboard number-one Latin songs of 2016

References

2016 singles
2016 songs
Prince Royce songs
Sony Music Latin singles
Songs written by Prince Royce
Spanish-language songs
Songs written by Daniel Santacruz